Physalaemus cuqui is a species of frog in the family Leptodactylidae.
It is found in Argentina, Bolivia, and possibly Paraguay.
Its natural habitats are subtropical or tropical dry forests, subtropical or tropical dry shrubland, subtropical or tropical moist shrubland, intermittent freshwater marshes, arable land, pastureland, ponds, irrigated land, and canals and ditches.

References 

 

cuqui
Taxonomy articles created by Polbot
Amphibians described in 1993